WSCR (670 AM) is a radio station in Chicago, Illinois.

WSCR may also refer to:
WYLL, a radio station (1160 AM) licensed to serve Chicago, Illinois, which held the call sign WSCR from 1997 to 2000
WCPT (AM), a radio station (820 AM) licensed to serve Chicago, Illinois, which held the call sign WSCR from 1992 to 1997
WATX (AM), a radio station (1220 AM) licensed to serve Hamden, Connecticut, which held the call sign WSCR from 1982 to 1987